Courbevoie is a commune located in the Hauts-de-Seine Department of the Île-de-France region of France. It is in the suburbs of the city of Paris,  from the center of Paris.

La Défense, a business district hosting the tallest buildings in the Paris metropolitan area, spreads over the southern part of Courbevoie (as well as parts of Puteaux and Nanterre).

Name
The name Courbevoie comes from Latin Curva Via and means "curved highway", allegedly in reference to a Roman road from Paris to Normandy that made a sharp turn to climb the hill over which Courbevoie was built.

Administration
Courbevoie is divided into two cantons: Canton of Courbevoie-1 and Canton of Courbevoie-2.

History
A wooden bridge was built crossing the Seine at Courbevoie by order of King Henry IV when in 1606 his royal coach fell into the river while being transported by ferry. Rebuilt in stone during the eighteenth century, this was replaced by a metal bridge in 1946.

The Convent of the Penitents founded in 1658 by Jean-Baptiste Forne was located in Courbevoie until the Revolution of 1789. Also located in the town was the barracks of the Swiss Guard of the monarchy.

Transport
Courbevoie is served by two stations on the Transilien Paris – Saint-Lazare suburban rail line: Courbevoie and Bécon-les-Bruyères. Courbevoie is also served by Esplanade de La Défense station on Paris Métro Line 1, in the business district of La Défense.

There are also a large number of city buses that come through the bustling La Défense station.

When it comes to air transportation, Courbevoie can be served by Paris's Charles de Gaulle Airport as well as Paris-Orly to the south and Beauvais Airport to the north.

Education
Courbevoie has multiple preschools and elementary schools. Junior high schools include:
 Collège Alfred de Vigny
 Collège Georges Pompidou
 Collège Georges Seurat
 Collège Les Bruyères
 Collège Les Renardières
 Collège Sainte Geneviève

Senior high schools include:
École européenne Paris La Défense
Lycée Paul Lapie de Courbevoie
Lycée Paul Painlevé Courbevoie
Collège Les renardières et Lycée Lucie Aubrac
Groupe scolaire Montalembert

Notable people

Georges Lamothe (1842–1894), composer, pianist and organist
Henri Letocart (1866–1945), organist and composer
Hélène Krzyżanowska (1867–1937), pianist and composer
Albert Gleizes (1881–1953), cubist artist, painter, theorist
Louis-Ferdinand Céline (1894–1961), writer
Jacques Henri Lartigue (1894–1986), photographer and painter
Arletty (1898–1992), actress and singer
Roy Benson (1914–1977), stage magician
Louis de Funès (1914–1983), actor and comedian
Henri Betti (1917–2005), composer
Madeleine Kamman (1930–2018), cook, culinary teacher, and author
Jean-Pierre Worms (1934–2019), representative to the French Parliament
Michel Delpech (1946–2016), singer-songwriter
Michel Blanc (b. 1952), actor
Franck Tchiloemba (b.1973), basketball player
Colomba Fofana (b. 1977), athlete
Lamine Kanté (b. 1987), basketball player
Massiré Kanté (b. 1989), footballer
Axel Augis (b. 1990), gymnast
William Rémy (b. 1991), footballer
Yoann Wachter (b. 1992), footballer
Marie-Bernadette Mbuyamba (b. 1993), basketball player

International relations

Courbevoie is twinned with:
 Enfield Town (London), United Kingdom
 Freudenstadt (Baden-Württemberg), Germany
 Beit Mery (Mount Lebanon), Lebanon

Mayors of Courbevoie

Antoine Le Frique (1800–1818)
Joseph Derbanne (October, 1818 – February, 1826)
Nicolas Rousselot (February 1826 – April 1830)
Jean-Baptiste Chevalier (April 1830 – August 1830)
Constant Grebaut (August 1830 – September 1840)
Désiré Maurenq (September 1840 – 1845)
Constant Grebaut (1845 – 26 August 1865)
Charles Blondel (26 August 1865 – 7 February 1872)
Jean-François Durenne (7 February 1872 – November 1873)
Jean-Baptiste Weiss (November 1873 – 20 February 1874)
Auguste Colas (20 February 1874 – 12 February 1878)
Frédéric Bourgin (12 February 1878 – October 1878)
Auguste Bailly (October 1878 – 19 May 1888)
Antoine Rolland (19 May 1888 – 15 May 1892)
Jules Lefevre (15 May 1892 – 27 January 1894)
François le Chippey (27 January 1894 – May 1896)
Léon Boursier (May 1896 – May 1908)
Charles Mering (May 1908 – December 1919)
Augustin Loiseau (December 1919 – October 1920)
Joseph Victor (October 1920 – May 1925)
Pierre Fouquart (May 1925 – September 1927)
André Grisoni (September 1927 – July 1944)
Gabriel Roche (September 1944 – 26 October 1947)
Marius Guerre (26 October 1947 – 20 December 1954)
Gabriel Roche (26 January 1955 – 15 March 1959)
Charles Deprez (26 March 1959 – 18 June 1995)
Jacques Kossowski (since 25 June 1995)

Demographics

Population

Immigration

Economy
Total S.A. has its head office in the Tour Total in La Défense and in Courbevoie. Areva has its head office in the Tour Areva in Courbevoie. Saint-Gobain also has its head office in Courbevoie.

The headquarters of INPI, the French government office for patents, copyrights, and trademarks, is in Courbevoie.

Gallery

See also

 La Défense business district.
 List of tallest structures in Paris
 Phare Tower, a 300-meter skyscraper now under construction
Communes of the Hauts-de-Seine department

References

External links

 Courbevoie official website 
 Courbevoie Community portal 
 blog about Courbevoie 

Communes of Hauts-de-Seine
Cities in Île-de-France
Hauts-de-Seine communes articles needing translation from French Wikipedia